Agonija is a 1998 Croatian film directed by Jakov Sedlar. The film is based on U agoniji, a play by Miroslav Krleža.

Cast 
 Ena Begović as Laura Lenbach
 Sven Medvešek as Krizovec
 Božidar Alić as Barun Lenbach
 Nives Ivanković as Izabela Georgijevna
 Zoja Odak as Izabelina ljubavnica
 Tarik Filipović as Inspektor

References

External links
 

1998 films
1990s Croatian-language films
Films directed by Jakov Sedlar
Croatian films based on plays
Films based on works by Croatian writers
Croatian drama films
1998 drama films